The Americas Zone was one of three zones of regional Federation Cup qualifying competition in 1994.  All ties were played at the Cochabamba T.C. in Cochabamba, Bolivia on clay courts.

The seventeen teams were divided into three pools of four and one pool of five to compete in round-robin matches. After each of the ties had been played, the teams that finished first, second and third in each of the respective pools would then move on to the knockout stage of the competition. The two teams that won two matches of the knockout stage would go on to advance to the World Group.

Pool Stage
 Date: April 11–15

Knockout stage

 ,  and  advanced to World Group.

References

 Fed Cup Profile, Paraguay
 Fed Cup Profile, Peru
 Fed Cup Profile, Costa Rica
 Fed Cup Profile, Chile
 Fed Cup Profile, Ecuador
 Fed Cup Profile, Trinidad and Tobago
 Fed Cup Profile, Jamaica
 Fed Cup Profile, Venezuela
 Fed Cup Profile, Uruguay
 Fed Cup Profile, Mexico
 Fed Cup Profile, Cuba
 Fed Cup Profile, Bolivia
 Fed Cup Profile, Guatemala

See also
Fed Cup structure

 
Americas
Tennis tournaments in Bolivia